Cyperus pandanophyllum is a species of sedge that is endemic to an area of eastern Madagascar.

The species was first formally described by the botanist Charles Baron Clarke in 1908.

See also
 List of Cyperus species

References

pandanophyllum
Taxa named by Charles Baron Clarke
Plants described in 1908
Endemic flora of Madagascar